Qizilqum Zarafshon, is an Uzbek professional football club based in Zarafshon. They play in the Uzbekistan Super League. Club is named after the biggest desert in the Central Asia, Qizilqum. Qizilqum in Uzbek literally means Red Sands.

History

Qizilqum was founded in 1967 under the name Progress. The club changed its name several times and was known as Qizilqum before becoming known as Progress. Since 1997 it has played as Qizilqum. The club made its debut in the Uzbek League in 2000. In its first season the club finished in 11th position. One year later, in the 2001 season, the club finished in 6th place in final League table. At the end of the 2002 season the club finished in 3rd position behind runners-up Neftchi Farg'ona which is their highest finishing position in the Uzbek League to date. Since 2000 the club has consequently play in the top league of Uzbek football.

Name changes history
 1967—1994: Progress
 1994—1995: Qizilqum
 1995—1997: Progress
 1997: Qizilqum

Domestic history

Stadium
The club's home ground is Progress Stadium with has a capacity of 5,000 and is located in Zarafshan. In August 2013 the Progress Stadium was closed for reconstruction. From August 2013 to May 2014 the club played its home matches in the 10,000-seater Sogdiana Stadium in Navoi. The Sogdiana Stadium is the home ground of the Navoi club, FC Yuzhanin Navoi. In May 2014 the club moved to another newly built stadium located in Navoi, the Yoshlar Stadium, to play its home matches.

Yoshlar Stadium with the attached sporting complex was built for Umid nihollari 2012; the republican sports games among school students. The construction work of the 12,500-all seater stadium and sporting complex started in April 2011 and finished in 2012. The sporting complex includes two indoor courts for volleyball, handball, basketball and other facilities. The festive opening of the new Yoshlar Stadium was held in May 2012 with the opening of the Umid nihollari 2012 games. In November 2012 the AFC awarded the new stadium A category class. The first official football match was played on 3 May 2014. This was a League match between Qizilqum and Dinamo Samarkand.

Current squad

Current technical staff
As of February 2014

Honours
 Uzbek League
 Third place: 2002

Managers
  Rustam Zabirov (2008–2010)
  Sergei Arslanov (2008–2010), caretaker
  Marat Kabaev (2011)
  Sergei Arslanov (2011), caretaker
  Ravshan Khaydarov (January 2012– April 2013)
  Rustam Zabirov (April 2013– July 2013)
  Yuriy Lukin (July 2013–)

References

External links
 FC Qizilqum Official Website 
 Qizilqum Zarafshon – soccerway
 Weltfussballarchiv 

Football clubs in Uzbekistan
Association football clubs established in 1967
1967 establishments in Uzbekistan